Participatory planning is an urban planning paradigm that emphasizes involving the entire community in the community planning process. Participatory planning emerged in response to the centralized and rationalistic approaches that defined early urban planning work. It has become a highly influential paradigm both in the context of traditional urban planning, and in the context of international community development. There is no singular theoretical framework or set of practical methods that make up participatory planning. Rather, it is a broad paradigm which incorporates a wide range of diverse theories and approaches to community planning. In general, participatory planning programs prioritize the integration of technical expertise with the preferences and knowledge of community members in the planning process. They also generally emphasize consensus building and collective community decision making, and prioritize the participation of traditionally marginalized groups in the planning process.

Origins

Rational planning tradition 
Prior to the 1970s,  community planning was generally directed in a top-down way by trained professionals. Modern community planning developed in the late 19th and early 20th centuries with as city governments and urban planners began to create centralized, comprehensive community plans such the garden cities of Ebenezer Howard. In this era, the rational planning model was far and away the dominant paradigm in urban planning. Under this model, professional planners would identify an established set of goals for a project, rationally weigh a set of alternatives to achieve those goals, and then create and implement a plan accordingly.

There was very little room for public participation within these rationalistic planning models. While discussing the common threads in the vision and work of early urban planners, Influential urbanist Peter Hall says that, "Their vision seems to have been that of the planner as the omniscient ruler, who should create new settlement forms … without interference or question. The complexities of planning in a ...a participatory democracy where individuals and groups have their own, often contradictory, notions of what should happen—all of these are absent from the work of these pioneers."

Rationalist approaches to planning were often applied during the urban renewal programs of the mid 20th century. Under these programs, large areas in major cities, often occupied by poorer people and people of color, were demolished, and a new plan for the area was designed and carried out. These urban renewal programs have prompted widespread criticism accusing them of destroying viable communities with long histories, and displacing disproportionately black and poor people to other underserved parts of the city.

Emergence of participatory planning 
In the 1960s and 70s, there was a growing wave of critical responses to these traditional rationalist approaches. Scholars criticized traditional planning methods as undemocratic and unresponsive to community needs. In her highly influential 1961 book The Death and Life of Great American Cities, Jane Jacobs argued that centralized planning methods are disconnected from real knowledge of life in a city. In 1969, Sherry Arnstein wrote a landmark essay titled A Ladder of Citizen Participation, to create a typology of different forms of citizen involvement in municipal programs, and criticize less participatory approaches to urban planning. In the 1970s a series of prominent planning theorists suggested alternative models of urban planning which were more participatory in nature. Prominent among them were John Friedmann's model of transactive planning, Paul Davidoff and Linda Davidoff's model of advocacy planning, and Stephen Grabow and Allen Heskin's theory of radical planning. These models constituted a broad theoretical turn towards a more participatory planning paradigm which has been highly influential on modern urban planning.

At around the same time, participation became increasingly central to planning policy and practice. In 1961, landscape architect Karl Linn started the first community design center in Philadelphia. Community design centers are organizations which work to provide planning expertise to marginalized communities. These grassroots participatory planning models became widespread, often organizing to fight major urban renewal projects. In the mid 1960s, the federal government responded to widespread criticisms of urban renewal by establishing the Model Cities Program and the Community Action Program. These two programs were part of Lyndon B. Johnson's Great Society, and included a much greated focus on community participation. The legislation establishing both programs included language requiring the "maximum feasible participation of the members of groups and areas to be served". These programs were highly influential, and marked an important turn towards a more participatory vision of urban planning.

Tools/methods
Participatory planning programs employ a wide range of methods and tools in order to facilitate public participation in the urban planning process. Since the 1960s, planning programs have relied on a wide range of tools such as referendums, focus groups, consensus conferences, citizen advisory committees, public hearings, and public opinion surveys in order to facilitate public participation. In addition, some planning practitioners employ more comprehensive approaches to participatory planning, such as Participatory Rural Appraisal. In recent years, social media and other digital tools in particular have transformed participatory urban planning. Many different organizations have integrated these participatory planning methods into their work, either conducting broad community planning projects, or conducting planning initiatives for specific purposes such as forest management, natural disaster risk reduction, and ancient rock art management.

Participatory rural appraisal 
Participatory Rural Appraisal is a leading method of participatory planning, employed most often in the context of international community development. Participatory Rural Appraisal draws heavily on the work of Paulo Freire and his idea of critical consciousness, as well as Kurt Lewin's integration of democratic leadership, group dynamics, experiential learning, action research, and open systems theory. PRA has been modified and reframed in the related models of Participatory Learning and Action (PLA), and Community-Based Participatory Research (CBPR). Robert Chambers, an important early practitioner of Participatory Rural Appraisal outlines a "menu" of specific methods and techniques that are central to the broad technique of Participatory Rural Appraisal, including but not limited to:

 Semi-structured interviews
 Participatory mapping and modeling
 Time lines and trend and change analysis
 Transect walks
 Daily time-use analysis
 Institutional diagramming
 Matrix scoring and ranking
 Shared presentations and analysis
 Oral histories and ethno-biographies

Participatory e-planning
Participatory Planning organizations use a range of digital tools to enhance and organize public participation in the planning process. E-participation has come into increasingly widespread use in public service programs as information and communications technologies have become more widely available. E-planning draws on the tools and techniques of e-participation in the  context of urban planning. It has been defined as, "a socio-cultural, ethical and political practice which takes place offline and online in the overlapping phases of the planning and decision-making cycle, by using digital and non-digital tools". Participatory e-planning research has generally focused on incorporating forms of participation with existing governance and urban planning processes. Some participatory e-planning programs involve the use of relatively simple digital tools like online questionnaires, surveys, and polls to consultant citizens. Other programs have used information and communications technologies that were designed for everyday use—such as mainstream social media—in order to seek out more widespread and open-ended public input. Often, the public engages with planners through social media outlets even if their input is not directly solicited, indicating that e-planning has the potential to foster organic bottom-up participatory planning. Other participatory planning processes have used existing digital technologies like virtual reality, and  interactive games in order to foster participation. In addition, certain digital tools have been designed specifically to foster public participation in urban planning.

Participatory geographic information systems 
Participatory Geographic Information Systems (GIS) are an increasingly widespread tool for participatory e-planning. Traditional GIS are computerized tools which organize a wide variety of geographically referenced information. This information is generally organized and displayed on a computerized map. Since the 1990s there have been increasingly widespread attempts to develop Participatory GIS systems. These systems are very diverse, applied in a wide range of contexts, and have incorporated many different ways of soliciting public participation, such as Participatory 3D Modelling. Often, participatory planning practitioners will create a detailed interactive map of a community using a GIS program, and then facilitate public input using the interactive map as a tool to foster more constructive deliberation between planners and community members. Several planning programs have combined Participatory GIS Software with large interactive touchscreens, so a large group of stakeholders can stand around an interactive map and manipulate it in order to offer their input. GIS technology has also been integrated with other kinds of Information and Communications Technology such as Decision Support Systems, to create  diverse interfaces for facilitating public participation.

Theoretical framework
Participatory planning is a broad paradigm rather than a single well-defined theory. A wide range of scholars, theorists, and urban planners have advocated for different theoretical models that emphasize citizen participation in the planning process. Collectively, these theories make up the participatory planning paradigm. A few of the most influential theoretical frameworks are described here.

Non-hierarchical planning 
In 1965, Christopher Alexander published a highly influential essay titled A City is Not a Tree, later expanded upon in a book of the same name. In the essay he argued against mainstream planning practices which represented cities with overly simplified hierarchical models. In those models, small systems or areas in cities were conceived of as subdivisions of larger systems and areas, which were in turn conceived of as subdivisions of larger systems and areas, in a model that resembled a tree. Alexander argued that these models are easy to understand, but don't reflect the reality of cities, in which different systems and communities interact in many complex and overlapping ways. Alexander proposed that urban planners should think of the city instead in a non-hierarchical "semi-lattice" structure. Alexander stresses that these new models require planners to incorporate much more complicated understandings of the city, and it is difficult for planners to fully understand all of the complicated interactions and structures that are incorporated in this semi-lattice view.

Other scholars drew on this critique to argue for more participatory, non-hierarchical approaches to planning. Scholars argued that non-hierarchical models of the city were too complex to be understood or designed through a centralized process, and so must rely on the input and perspectives of a wide range of people. This non-hierarchical understanding of how cities function laid the groundwork for the participatory planning paradigm.

Arnstein's ladder of citizen participation

Responding to the persistent gap between the desires of local communities, and traditional rationalistic approaches to planning, Sherry Arnstein wrote her essay A Ladder of Citizen Participation in 1969 to "encourage a more enlightened dialogue". The ladder is a typology of different levels of citizen participation in government programs.

She describes eight different forms of participation, arranged in three categories: non-participation, degrees of tokenism, and degrees of citizen power. She advocates that government projects and planning processes should involve the forms of citizen participation that she places higher on the ladder. Her critical assault has become highly influential on current theory and practice of citizen participation in urban planning and government programs, and is a very important piece of the participatory planning paradigm. Participatory planning programs incorporate many diverse levels and forms of participation, but they generally draw on Arnstein's central critique of programs that have no role for citizen input, or only incorporate tokenistic participation.

Participatory planning models 
Within the participatory planning paradigm there are several explicitly defined theoretical models of what participatory planning should look like. The kind of participation that these models call for varies, but they all emphasize participation as a central piece of a well designed approach to planning. The following are several of the most influential participatory planning models.

Advocacy planning 
Paul Davidoff and Linda Davidoff, in their influential essay Advocacy and Pluralism in Planning, proposed a participatory approach to planning called Advocacy Planning, In which trained planners would work directly with different groups of people in the city, including underrepresented communities and interest groups, to design plans which corresponded to those groups' specific needs. Planners would then argue on behalf of these plans in front of a central planning commission.

Transactive planning 
John Friedmann proposed a transactive model of planning in his 1973 book Retracking America: A Theory of Transactive Planning. Transactive planning suggested that urban planners should engage in direct face-to-face conversation with members of the community who have immediate, experiential knowledge of their neighborhood. Under transactive planning, this dialog is paired with collaborative action, in which planners and community members each engage in the design process. This model emphasizes learning and development of the people and institutions involved, rather than more specific programmatic goals.

Radical planning 
Stephen Grabow and Allan Heskin advocated for a model they call radical planning in their 1973 essay Foundations for a Radical Concept of Planning. Radical planning calls for sweeping structural changes in the planning field. Heskin and Grabow argued that planning decisions should be broadly decentralized and connected more closely to small communities that they affected most directly, and that planners should not be thought of as separate from the communities they serve. Heskin and Grabow wrote that under radical planning "the 'planner' is one of us, or all of us."

Communicative planning 
A group of planning theorists in the 1980s and 90s including Patsy Healey and Judith Innes developed a participatory model of planning which they refer to as communicative planning. Communicative planning draws heavily on Habermas's idea of communicative rationality, and proposes an approach to planning in which diverse stakeholders in the planning process participate in deliberative conversations, work to resolve conflicts in their values and priorities, and collectively create a consensus plan. In this process, planners serve to facilitate this deliberation and offer technical expertise when called for.

Examples

World Bank
The community-driven development approach advocated by the World Bank is an example of participatory planning.

A number of examples link participatory community plans with local government planning. One widely applied example is South Africa's national policy of community-based planning methodology, and an adapted version, the Harmonised Participatory Planning Guide for Lower Level Local Governments, which is national policy in Uganda. Community-Based Planning has been applied across the whole of eThekwini Metropolitan Municipality in South Africa, including the City of Durban, and is being rolled out in Ekurhuleni Metropolitan Municipality. Community-Based Planning is an example of the practical application of the sustainable living.

Britain in the 1940s
After the bombing of British cities during World War II, planning advocates wanted to use the reconstruction planning as a way to engage the public. The planners wanted more authority in the political system to play a more substantive role within their democracy. The planners created new techniques to, "communicate with laypeople, including mobilizing publicity, measuring public opinion, organizing exhibitions, and experimenting with new visual strategies" They also developed a forum to educate and ask the public about various plans and policies.

Cincinnati's Over-the-Rhine neighborhood
Cincinnati's Over-The-Rhine's Comprehensive Plan was created in a participatory planning process, but its consistent monitoring of its implementation failed. Looking at Cincinnati's Over-the-Rhine neighborhood, geographers saw potential logistical ways to obtain "necessary data, create a land-use GIS to analyze the data, update the data, and monitor the progress of the implementation of the Over-the Rhine Comprehensive Plan". In the case of Cincinnati, it is proven that plans that are not carried out fail to live up to the participatory planning theory. Failures like that of the Over-the-Rhine plan make it harder for further progress toward plan's goal and objectives as well as muting the participants.

Managing forests 
Forest management involves a variety of stakeholders, including the owners of the forest, locals, tourism enterprises, recreational uses, private or official conservationists, or the forest industry. Each of these parties has a different goal in using forests, which complicates planning. Participatory approaches and computerized tools like decision support systems (DSS) have been used to help balance these diverse priorities. The features of DSS that can help participatory processes in the context of forest management. are the following: "group decision support, possibilities to include other values than timber production, flexibility of system to include non-traditional forest data and management options, and multi-criteria decision analysis tools."

What are the Solutions for this challenge
Ensuring that all sections of the community are able to participate is a challenge for participatory planning. Some approaches, such as Community-Based Planning, separate the community so that the livelihoods and preferred outcomes of different social groups can be identified.

Many experiences with participatory reflection and action and participatory planning suffer from a lack of follow-up. PRA has often not been part of a system, but an ad hoc process. Community-Based Planning has tried to overcome this by linking planning to the mainstream local government planning system.

Another challenge is caused by a lack of funds to actually implement the plans, which can lead to participation fatigue and frustration among communities. In the social-investment funds supported by the World Bank, participatory planning is often the first step, often leading to planning of infrastructure. In some cases, such as Community-Based Planning in South Africa, amounts of around US$3,500 to $6,800 are provided to each ward to implement activities arising from the ward plan. This then stimulates more widespread community action.

Organizations working in participatory planning

Center for Urban Pedagogy
The Center for Urban Pedagogy (CUP) in New York City "is a nonprofit organization that uses design and art to improve civic engagement". CUP projects aim to involve more individuals to work on policy and urban planning issues. CUP increases the public understanding of urban planning systems so that more of the community becomes involved. "CUP projects are collaborations of art and design professionals, community-based advocates and policymakers, and our staff"[9]. Together, these community members work on issues ranging from the juvenile justice system to zoning law to food access. CUP takes these issues and simplifies them to accessible, visual interpretations. The tools created by CUP are used by New York City organizers and educators to push for better communities.

See also 
 Community development
 Free association of producers
 Participatory budgeting
 Participatory design
 Participatory development
 Participatory economics
 Participatory justice
 Public participation
 Public participation (decision making)
 Urban acupuncture

Notes

References

Bibliography
 Goldman, Ian and Abbott, Joanne, eds. (April 2004) "Decentralisation and community-based planning." Participatory Learning and Action Notes 49.  International Institute for Environment and Development:London.

External links
 The World Bank Participation Sourcebook: Participatory Planning
 Communities and Local Government UK: Participatory Planning for Sustainable Communities: International experience in mediation, negotiation and engagement in making plans

Urban planning
Planning